Creature is a 2011 American monster horror comedy film directed by Fred M. Andrews, based on a screenplay written by Andrews and Tracy Morse. The film is set in a Louisiana Bayou, where a group of friends discover a local legend and are in a fight for their survival. The film opened in theaters on September 9, 2011, in the United States and Canada.  It stars Mehcad Brooks, Serinda Swan, Amanda Fuller, Dillon Casey, Lauren Schneider, Aaron Hill, Daniel Bernhardt, and Sid Haig.

Plot

A group of young adults – Oscar and Karen, Beth and her marine infantry boyfriend Randy, and the latter's sister Emily and her boyfriend Niles, who is an ex-Navy SEAL – are traveling through the backwoods town of Fort Collins, Louisiana, when they pull over at a rundown gas station. While there, Oscar discovers a shrine to local legend, Lockjaw. The townies give the boys directions to a house built by "Grimley" himself, a local tourist attraction that they are hesitant to explore, only Oscar and Beth seem interested and convince the others to go with them. En route, Oscar tells them all the legend of Lockjaw:

A long time ago, Grimley Boutine and his sister Caroline were the last two remaining members of their clan. Incest was a part of their family and heritage, so it was no surprise that she was carrying his child and the two were madly in love and due to be married, but the day before their wedding, an albino alligator dragged Caroline off into the swamp. Grimley sought out the gator in the hopes that he would find her alive, but instead he came across her being devoured in a corpse-filled, half-flooded mine tunnel. Going insane with rage, Grimley killed the gator with his bare hands, before eating its flesh, then consuming the flesh of his sister, along with every other piece of flesh in the cave, slowly devolving, becoming half-man, half-alligator himself.

The others disbelieve the story, and they finally arrive at Grimley's house, unaware that they are being stalked by something in the swamp. They set up camp for the night near the Grimley house for an evening of drinking and having fun. Meanwhile, one of the shop patrons, Grover, is slaughtered by an unseen beast on the riverbank after ignoring warnings to not defy Grimley. Randy leaves the group to get more beer from the truck, returning just in time to interrupt Karen from taking advantage of a drunken Beth. Emily and Niles, having gone off on their own, admit their love and devotion to one another before making love, unaware that Oscar is secretly taking photos. Karen finds him, and masturbates him to climax as he continues to take photographs of the couple. When Oscar refuses to return the favor, however, she walks off and is knocked unconscious by Chopper, the owner of the store they'd come across. It is revealed that Oscar and Karen are both his children, and subservient to Lockjaw himself, he takes Karen away. Randy witnesses this and sees Lockjaw before running off into the woods. Oscar collapses on Emily and Niles, claiming that Randy had attacked him; Niles leaves Emily to treat Oscar's shock as he goes off in search of Randy. Randy and Niles both encounter Lockjaw and run, coming across a highway that they had supposedly gotten far off track from earlier; they return to look for Emily, only to be stopped by one of the shop workers who holds them at gunpoint. Niles is able to kill him, but Lockjaw gruesomely murders Randy.

Afterward, Beth awakens from her drunken unconsciousness, her tent having been moved into a deep dark cave. As she emerges from it she discovers Lockjaw eating one of his victims and lets out a horrified scream, being presumably killed by him. Karen, having been set up as a sacrifice to Lockjaw, has her feet cut off by her father to lure Lockjaw from the underground, saying that it must be done for the family. After he leaves, Lockjaw emerges from the cavern below the shack and seems to recognize her by the necklace Chopper put around her neck, the same one that belonged to his sister. Niles finds Karen dead when he comes across the cabin, and is attacked by Oscar but quickly dispatches him with a machete. Afterwards, he sneaks into Lockjaw's cave to save Emily, when they emerge they manage a brief escape before she is taken by Chopper and his followers, with Lockjaw throwing Niles into the river to drown or become food to the gators. Chopper says to Emily that Lockjaw has chosen her to become his next bride. Niles, who is alive, follows the party to a gathering ritual that will allow Grimley to impregnate Emily. During the ceremony, Niles attacks, and after receiving a brutal beating from the overpowering Lockjaw, he manages to knock him into a sinkhole to drown. He unties Emily but, as Niles is reviving her, Lockjaw attacks again, pulling Emily into the hole, with Niles following. Later, at dawn, Emily and Niles (who is holding the jaw of Lockjaw) emerge from the sink hole alive. They manage to make their way back to their truck and ride off into the rising sun.

Some time later, Chopper arrives at the refurbished Grimley cabin, which is hopping with family and friends in a huge celebration. It is revealed that Beth had survived her ordeals with Lockjaw and now has a baby, who Chopper seems sure is going to "grow up to be as strong as his daddy". It is shown that the baby's face is somewhat mutated and the screen goes dark.

Cast 
 Mehcad Brooks as Niles, an ex–Navy SEAL who left the military to be with Emily.
 Serinda Swan as Emily, Niles' girlfriend.
 Dillon Casey as Oscar, Chopper's son and Karen's brother.
 Lauren Schneider as Karen, Oscar’s sister and Chopper's daughter.
 Amanda Fuller as Beth, Randy's girlfriend.
 Aaron Hill as Randy, Emily's brother, a US Marine.
 Pruitt Taylor Vince as Grover
 Daniel Bernhardt as Grimley / Lockjaw, a man turned ravenous half-alligator beast who feeds on human flesh.
 Sid Haig as Chopper, the leader of Lockjaw's cult and patriarch to his clan.
 Jennifer Lynn Warren as Ophelia

Production

Creature was initially going to be a graphic novel named Lockjaw.  Paul Mason, an executive producer, suggested to Andrews that it might be better done as a film.  Andrews, who had worked as a production designer, agreed to direct. The film's incest themes were influenced by H. P. Lovecraft's Cthulhu Mythos, in which rural, inbred cults worshiped inhuman creatures.  More background on the creature was in the original script, but it did not make it into the film.  The creature, which in the early stages was a serial killer in a slasher film, was eventually converted into more of a mutant.

Release

Box office
Creature was released theatrically in the United States on September 9, 2011. The film grossed  $327,000 from 1,507 venues on its opening weekend, making it the second lowest grossing first weekend ever for a film appearing on 1,500+ screens, and the third worst per location average ever.  It ended its run with a domestic gross of $508,714.

Home media
The film was released on DVD on September 11, 2012 in the United States and Canada by Anderson Merchandisers, Lp and Phase 4 Films respectively.

Reception

Critical reception for the film has been overwhelmingly negative. Rotten Tomatoes, a review aggregator, reports that 10% of 29 surveyed critics gave the film a positive review; the average rating is 2.86/10. Scott Foy of Dread Central panned the film awarding it a score of 1/5 stars and called it unworthy of wide release. Neil Genzlinger from The New York Times gave the film a negative review stating in his review on the film, "The six actors in the central, edible roles seem as if they could have pulled off a Scream-like satire, but since they weren’t asked to, there’s nothing much for them to do but follow the clearly visible paths to their doom. Not all are doomed, of course — film tradition demands some survivors — but the climactic scene, which seems to draw on mud wrestling for inspiration, is so silly that perhaps those who do make it through this swampy ordeal wish they hadn't". Corey Hall from Metro Times panned the film, concluding, "Creature is so laughably pathetic that it's worth a few chuckles, but the really amazing thing is that huckster Sid Sheinberg put up the cash to dump this slime-covered turd into more than 1,500 theaters nationwide, proving that hope, like evil swamp monsters, is eternal".  Mark Olsen of the Los Angeles Times called it a "delightfully dopey" film that "has no illusions about what it is: a down-and-dirty, breasts-and-blood, creature-horror exploitation picture".

References

Further reading
 Big Hype, Big Creature in This Trailer on Shock Till You Drop 
 Don't Get Out of the Boat in this First Trailer for Creature Starring Sid Haig on 28 Days Later Analysis 
 Creature Proves Blood is Blood and Gets a New One-Sheet and Trailer on Dread Central
 Sheinberg to self-distribute indie horror Creature on Screen Daily
 It Came Out of the Viral Media Swamp in The New York Times

External links 
 
 
 
 
 
 

2011 films
2011 horror films
American monster movies
Films set in Louisiana
Incest in film
2010s monster movies
2011 directorial debut films
2010s English-language films
2010s American films